This is a list of Brazilian television related events from 1997.

Events

Debuts

Television shows

1970s
Turma da Mônica (1976–present)

1990s
Malhação (1995–present)
Cocoricó (1996–present)

Ending this year
Castelo Rá-Tim-Bum (1994-1997)

Births

Deaths

See also
1997 in Brazil